Madness for Love is a 1948 Spanish historical drama film directed by Juan de Orduña.

The movie is based on the play The Madness of Love written in 1855 by Manuel Tamayo y Baus around the figure of Queen Joanna of Castile; who attracted authors, composers, and artists of the romanticist movement, due to her characteristics of unrequited love, obsessive jealousy, and undying fidelity.

The film is also known as The Mad Queen. It was made by CIFESA, Spain's largest film company at the time, which turned out a number of historical films during the late 1940s. It was given an American release in 1950.

In 2001, Vicente Aranda made a remake titled Juana la Loca.

Plot summary 
The story of Queen Joanna of Castile, known as "Juana la loca," and her husband Philip I of Castile, also known as "Philip the handsome."

Cast

References

Bibliography 
 Mira, Alberto. Historical Dictionary of Spanish Cinema. Scarecrow Press, 2010.

External links 
 
 "Political Madness: Juan de Orduña´s Locura de amor as a National Allegory." Essay by Santiago Juan-Navarro

1948 films
1940s Spanish-language films
1940s historical drama films
Spanish black-and-white films
Spanish films based on plays
Films set in the 16th century
Films set in Spain
Spanish historical drama films
Cultural depictions of Joanna of Castile
Cifesa films
Films scored by Juan Quintero Muñoz
1948 drama films
1940s Spanish films